Lamprosema distentalis is a species of moth of the family Crambidae. It was described by Hans Georg Amsel in 1866. It is found in Brazil.

References

Moths described in 1866
Lamprosema
Moths of South America